Bosara refusaria is a moth in the family Geometridae. It is found on Borneo, Bali and the Philippines. The habitat consists of lowland dipterocarp forests and secondary forests.

References

Moths described in 1861
Eupitheciini
Moths of Asia